The Monroe Symphony (MSO) is a professional American orchestra located in Monroe, Louisiana. The orchestra was founded in 1971 by Dr. Richard Worthington, who served as its musical director from 1971 until 1991. Dr. Clay Couturiaux is the current music director.

The orchestra's season consists of classical concerts, pops concerts, and an educational concert offered to local elementary school students. The MSO also holds the annual Marjorie Stricklin Emerging Artists Competition to promote and encourage excellence in musical performance, and to provide orchestral performance opportunities for youth and young adults residing in Louisiana.

References

External links
 Monroe Symphony Orchestra

American orchestras
Musical groups from Louisiana
Musical groups established in 1971
Performing arts in Louisiana